Lacroix-Saint-Ouen is a commune in the Oise department in northern France.

It lies 75 km north of Paris.

Population
The inhabitants are called Croisés-Saintodoniens.

See also
 Communes of the Oise department

References

External links

 Official site
 Lacroix-Saint-Ouen Webcam

Communes of Oise